Autograph – Ek Japun Thevavi Ashi Lovestory also known as Autograph, is an upcoming Indian Marathi-language romantic drama film directed by Satish Rajwade and produced by Sanjay Chhabria and Ashwin Anchan under the banners of Everest Entertainment and STV Networks. The film stars Ankush Chaudhari, Amruta Khanvilkar, Urmila Kothare, and Manasi Moghe. The story of the film is a unique perspective on relationships, heartbreaks, and the memories that treasure over life.

The film was announced on 18 July 2022, and was scheduled for a theatrical release on 30 December 2022.

Cast 

 Ankush Chaudhari as Samar
 Amruta Khanvilkar as Julia
 Urmila Kothare as Saavni
 Manasi Moghe as Anushka
 Mangala Kenkre

Production 
The film was officially announced on 18 July 2022, with the release of a motion poster. 

This is Chaudhari and Rajwade's third collaboration; they previously collaborated on Gaiir and Ti Saddhya Kay Karte. Khanvilkar was then a part of Gaiir, while Kothare was a part of Ti Saddhya Kay Karte.

Soundtrack

Release 
Autograph – Ek Japun Thevavi Ashi Lovestory was set to be released in theatres on 30 December 2022, alongside Riteish Deshmukh's Ved. The film's release date has been postponed.

References

External links
 

Films directed by Satish Rajwade
Upcoming Indian films
2020s Marathi-language films